Piotr Rocki (11 January 1974 – 1 June 2020) was a Polish football player.

Career
Rocki was born in Warsaw. On 5 May 2008 he joined Legia Warsaw. Before he played for Polonez Warsaw, Marcovia Marki, Polonia Warsaw, Hetman Zamość, Górnik Zabrze, Odra Wodzisław Śląski and later for Dyskobolia Grodzisk Wielkopolski.

For Odra, he played 75 matches scoring 18 goals, becoming a fan favorite.

Right before the 2008/2009 season he joined Legia Warsaw. During his 2nd match for Legia, Rocki scored the winning goal for his team in the Polish SuperCup against Wisła Kraków on 20 July 2008.

After the 2008/09 season he joined a Polish First League club Podbeskidzie Bielsko-Biała. Later he played in Polonia Bytom.

He died in Bytom.

Achievements 
 Polish Cup -Dyskobolia Grodzisk Wielkopolski (2006/07 season)
 Polish Ekstraklasa Cup - Dyskobolia Grodzisk Wielkopolski (2006/07 season)
 Polish Ekstraklasa Cup- Dyskobolia Grodzisk Wielkopolski (2007/08 season)
 Polish SuperCup - Legia Warsaw (2008/09 season)

References

External links
 

1974 births
2020 deaths
Polish footballers
Polonia Warsaw players
Legia Warsaw players
Dyskobolia Grodzisk Wielkopolski players
Górnik Zabrze players
Odra Wodzisław Śląski players
Podbeskidzie Bielsko-Biała players
Ruch Radzionków players
GKS Tychy players
Kolejarz Stróże players
Ekstraklasa players
Footballers from Warsaw
Association football forwards